
Laguna Verde is a lake in the Beni Department, Bolivia. At an elevation of 175 m, its surface area is 4.53 km².

Lakes of Beni Department